Silverwood Theme Park is an amusement park located in the city of Athol in northern Idaho, United States, near the town of Coeur d'Alene, approximately  from Spokane, Washington on US 95. Owner Gary Norton opened the park on June 20, 1988. Originally, the park included a small assortment of carnival rides, a "main street" with shops and eateries, and an authentic steam train that traveled in a 30-minute loop around the owner's property. From 1973 to 1988, the land, along with a fully functioning airstrip, was operated as the Henley Aerodrome, named after the family whom Norton bought it from in 1981.

Over the years, Silverwood has grown in both size and popularity, transforming from a small local amusement park to a regional theme park destination. In 2003, an adjacent waterpark named Boulder Beach Water Park was opened.  Entrance to Boulder Beach is included with admission to Silverwood.  In 2009, Silverwood began an annual Halloween event called Scarywood, held during evenings in the month of October.

It is also the northernmost theme park in the United States. In 2019, Silverwood co-hosted (along with Rocky Mountain Construction) the Golden Ticket Awards.

Timeline

Scarywood Haunted Nights
In 2009, Silverwood opened Scarywood Haunted Nights, a nighttime fright fest filled with scare zones and mazes. In 2010, Scarywood returned on a larger, grander scale with more to do. The main attractions for Scarywood include: Blood Bayou, an indoor haunted attraction; Planet Zombie, another outdoor haunt ; several scare zones and other walk through as well as the Timber Terror: Backwards. In 2020, due to concerns with Covid-19, Scarywood was cancelled. The park did remain open weekends in October without the scary theming though. Scarywood Haunted Nights returned in 2021 with one new haunted house - Pharaoh's Curse.

Current Silverwood Theme Park rides

Roller coasters

Other rides

Defunct Rides

Current Boulder Beach Water Park slides & attractions

Gallery

References

External links
Silverwoodthemepark.com Official Site
Silverwoodexpress.com Official Blog
Roller Coaster Alley Unofficial site with message boards, park information, a Silverwood Wiki, and more.

1988 establishments in Idaho
Amusement parks in Idaho
Amusement parks opened in 1988
Buildings and structures in Kootenai County, Idaho
Heritage railroads in Idaho
Railroads of amusement parks in the United States
Tourist attractions in Kootenai County, Idaho
Water parks in Idaho